Andrey Razin (born 12 August 1979) is a Belarusian professional football coach and former player.

Honours
Dinamo Minsk
 Belarusian Premier League champion: 2004
 Belarusian Cup champion: 2002–03

Minsk
 Belarusian Cup champion: 2012–13

External links

1979 births
Living people
Belarusian footballers
Belarus under-21 international footballers
Association football midfielders
Belarusian expatriate footballers
Expatriate footballers in Sweden
Expatriate footballers in Russia
Belarusian Premier League players
FC Dynamo Brest players
FC Dinamo Minsk players
FC Torpedo Minsk players
FC Anzhi Makhachkala players
Enköpings SK players
FC Darida Minsk Raion players
FC Zvezda Irkutsk players
FC Minsk players
Belarusian football managers
FC Minsk managers
Sportspeople from Brest, Belarus